The Party of Proletarian Unity (PUP) was a French socialist political party.

History 
It was formed on December 21, 1930 by leftists expelled from the French Communist Party (PCF), together with some who had previously belonged to the left-wing of the Section française de l'Internationale ouvrière (SFIO). Its members were known in France as pupistes, and one of its notable leaders was Alexandre Bachelet.

At one time, the party held ten seats in the Chamber of Deputies of the Third Republic. The PUP affiliated to the London Bureau of left-socialist parties. On January 31, 1937, it voted to rejoin the SFIO. 

Many of the top members of the PUP subsequently were involved with collaboration with the Axis powers during the Vichy regime.

External links 
 Biography of A. E. Bachelet (in French)

Political parties established in 1930
Proletarian Unity
Political parties of the French Third Republic
Political parties disestablished in 1937
1930 establishments in France
1937 disestablishments in France
International Revolutionary Marxist Centre